Charles Glover Barkla FRS FRSE (7 June 1877 – 23 October 1944) was a British physicist, and the winner of the Nobel Prize in Physics in 1917 for his work in X-ray spectroscopy and related areas in the study of X-rays (Roentgen rays).

Life
Barkla was born in Widnes, England, to John Martin Barkla, a secretary for the Atlas Chemical Company, and Sarah Glover, daughter of a watchmaker.

Barkla studied at the Liverpool Institute and proceeded to Liverpool University with a County Council Scholarship and a Bibby Scholarship. Barkla initially studied Mathematics but later specialised in Physics under Sir Oliver Lodge. During the absence of Oliver Lodge due to ill health, Barkla replaced him in lectures.

In 1899 Barkla was admitted to Trinity College, Cambridge, with an 1851 Research Fellowship from the Royal Commission for the Exhibition of 1851, to work in the Cavendish Laboratory under the physicist J. J. Thomson (discoverer of the electron). During his first two years at Cambridge, under the directions of Thomson, Barkla studied the velocity of electromagnetic waves along wires of different widths and materials.

After a year and a half at Trinity College, Cambridge, his love of music led him to transfer to King's College, Cambridge, in order to sing in their chapel choir. Barkla's voice was of remarkable beauty and his solo performances were always fully attended.  He completed his Bachelor of Arts degree in 1903, and then his Master of Arts degree in 1907. He married Mary Esther Cowell in the same year, with whom he had two sons and one daughter.

In 1913, after having worked at the Universities of Cambridge, Liverpool, and King's College London, Barkla was appointed as a Professor of Natural Philosophy at the University of Edinburgh in 1913, a position that he held until his death.

Barkla made significant progress in developing and refining the laws of X-ray scattering, X-ray spectroscopy, the principles governing the transmission of X-rays through matter, and especially the principles of the excitation of secondary X-rays. For his discovery of the characteristic X-rays of elements, Barkla was awarded the Nobel Prize in Physics in 1917. He was also awarded the Hughes Medal of the British Royal Society that same year.

Barkla proposed the J-phenomenon as a hypothetical form of X-ray behaviour similar to X-ray fluorescence but other scientists were not persuaded that this was a different mechanism from other known effects such as Compton scattering and so the theory was not successful.

From 1922 to 1938 he lived at Hermitage of Braid in south-west Edinburgh.

He died in Edinburgh on 23 October 1944.

Personal life 

A religious man, Barkla was a Methodist and considered his work to be "part of the quest for God, the Creator".

Public recognition

The lunar crater Barkla was named in the honour of Charles Barkla. 

A plaque exists on Barkla's house at Hermitage of Braid in Edinburgh. A commemorative plaque has been installed in the vicinity of the Canongate, near the Faculty of Education Buildings, at the University of Edinburgh. Additionally, a lecture theatre at the University of Liverpool's Physics department, as well as a Biophysics laboratory in the Biological science department, are named after him. In 2012 a gritter in Barkla's home town of Widnes was named in his honour, following a competition run by the local newspaper.

References

External links

  including the Nobel Lecture, June 3, 1920 Characteristic Röntgen Radiation
 Obituary
 his discovery of the characteristic Röntgen radiation of the elements
 Biography at Encyclopedia.com

1877 births
1944 deaths
20th-century British physicists
Alumni of Trinity College, Cambridge
Alumni of King's College, Cambridge
Academics of King's College London
Academics of the University of Edinburgh
English physicists
English Methodists
Fellows of the Royal Society
Nobel laureates in Physics
People from Widnes
People educated at Liverpool Institute High School for Boys
English Nobel laureates
Spectroscopists